Mateta or Matéta may refer to:

 Jean-Philippe Mateta (born 1997), French footballer
 Luc Adamo Matéta (born 1949), Congolese politician